Laurie Zoloth (born 1950) is an American ethicist, currently Margaret E. Burton Professor at the University of Chicago Divinity School. She was dean of the Divinity School from 2017  to 2018, whereupon she stepped into an advisory administrative position.

Ethicist

Laurie Zoloth writes in the fields of religious studies and bioethics, with a focus on ethics of genetic engineering, stem cell research, synthetic biology, and social justice in health care.  She is the author of Health Care and the Ethics of Encounter: A Jewish Discussion of Social Justice (University of North Carolina Press, 1999) and editor (with Dena Davis) of Notes from a Narrow Ridge: Religion and Bioethics (University Publishing Group, 1999) and (with Elliot Dorff) Jews and Genes: The Genetic Future in Contemporary Jewish Thought (Jewish Publication Society, 2015).

She is co-founder of The Ethics Practice, a group that has provided bioethics consultation and education services to health care providers and health care systems nationally.  She is a member of the Howard Hughes Medical Institute National Bioethics Advisory Board. She serves on the NASA National Advisory Board to IACUC, NASA’s Interagency National Animal Care and Use Committees and the national advisory board of the American Association for the Advancement of Science’s Dialogue on Science, Ethics and Religion. Zoloth has been the president of the American Academy of Religion and the American Society for Bioethics and Humanities. She is an elected member of The Hastings Center and a life member of Clare Hall, Cambridge. She is a founding board member of the Society for Scriptural Reasoning.

Career
Zoloth began her career as a neonatal nurse working in impoverished communities.  She has a bachelor's degree in women's studies from UC Berkeley and in nursing from SUNY. From 2000-2003 she was Professor of Social Ethics and Jewish Philosophy at San Francisco State University, from which she holds a master's degree in English. From 2003-2017 she was jointly Professor of Medical Humanities and Bioethics in the Feinberg School of Medicine and Professor of Religious Studies in the Weinberg College of Arts and Sciences at Northwestern University. From 2005 she has been an Affiliated Professor at the University of Haifa. She was appointed Dean of Chicago Divinity School in July 2017, making her the first Jew to become the dean of a divinity school based at an American university.

References

External links
Faculty page

1950 births
American ethicists
Jewish ethicists
Living people
University of Chicago Divinity School faculty
Bioethicists
San Francisco State University faculty
Northwestern University faculty
Academic staff of the University of Haifa
Jewish American academics
Presidents of the American Society for Bioethics and Humanities
21st-century American Jews